The Seven Wonders of Canada was a 2007 competition sponsored by CBC Television's The National and CBC Radio One's Sounds Like Canada. They sought to determine Canada's "seven wonders" by receiving nominations from viewers, and then from on-line voting of the short list. After the vote, a panel of judges, Ra McGuire, Roy MacGregor and Roberta L. Jamieson, picked the winners based on geographic and poetic criteria. Their seven picks were revealed on The National on June 7, 2007. The Seven Wonders as chosen by Canada were the Sleeping Giant, Niagara Falls, the Bay of Fundy, Nahanni National Park Reserve, the Northern Lights, the Rockies, and the Cabot Trail.

CBC's Seven Wonders of Canada

Top seven as voted by Canada

Full voting results

Short list

See also

 Wonders of the World (disambiguation)
 Wonders of the World

References

 
 

2007 in Canada
2000s Canadian reality television series
CBC Radio One programs
CBC Television original programming
C
Nature-related lists